Pieter Pietersz Nedek (1616–1686) was a Dutch Golden Age painter.

He was born and died in Amsterdam.  According to Arnold Houbraken he was the same age as Govert Flinck and was a landscape painter who had been a pupil of Pieter Lastman. He died a bachelor, aged 70.

According to the RKD he was a pupil of Lastman, and is known for winter landscapes.

References

1616 births
1686 deaths
Dutch Golden Age painters
Dutch male painters
Painters from Amsterdam